Frank Benjamin "Pep" Saul Jr. (February 16, 1924 – November 7, 2019) was an American professional basketball player. He played in the National Basketball Association (NBA) for the Rochester Royals, Baltimore Bullets and Minneapolis Lakers. Saul won four consecutive NBA championships from 1951 to 1954. He played college basketball for the Seton Hall Pirates and had his number 3 retired by the team.

Early life
Saul was born in Oradell and raised in Westwood, New Jersey, as the eldest of eight children to Frank and Lena Saul. He attended Holy Trinity High School in Hackensack, where he captained the baseball and basketball teams to state championships. He transferred to Seton Hall Preparatory in West Orange for his senior year.

College basketball career
Saul played collegiately for the Seton Hall Pirates men's basketball, leaving college after his freshman year to serve for three years in the United States Army during World War II. He scored his 1,000th career point in a game against Creighton University on March 5, 1949, making him the first player from Seton Hall to reach that milestone.

Professional career
Saul won four consecutive NBA championships with the Rochester Royals in 1951 and with the Minneapolis Lakers from 1952 to 1954. He, Steve Kerr and Patrick McCaw are the only three players in NBA history who won three championships with two different teams in consecutive seasons, with him and Kerr winning four times in a row.

Later life and death
Saul worked in insurance after his athletic retirement. He worked with State Farm and James E. Wordley Agency before he opened his own agency in 1967; he sold his business in 1994. 

Saul was married to his wife for 72 years and had eight children. He was a resident of East Hanover, New Jersey. Saul died on November 7, 2019 at the age of 95.

References

External links

1924 births
2019 deaths
American men's basketball players
Baltimore Bullets (1944–1954) players
Basketball players from New Jersey
Minneapolis Lakers players
People from East Hanover, New Jersey
People from Westwood, New Jersey
Rochester Royals draft picks
Rochester Royals players
Seton Hall Pirates men's basketball players
Shooting guards
Sportspeople from Bergen County, New Jersey
United States Army personnel of World War II